Xanthos is a Greek surname. It is the surname of:
 Andreas Xanthos, Greek medical doctor and government minister of Health.
 Charalambos Xanthos, Greek Cypriot hotel and restaurant owner
 Emmanuil Xanthos (1772–1852), Greek merchant

See also
 Xanthus (disambiguation)

Greek-language surnames
Surnames